Baraki is a district in Algiers Province, Algeria. It was named after a name of a bar's owner (AKI) SO 'Bar' for the place and 'Aki' was his name BAR-AKI , Baraki. Baraki is located in the suburbs southeast of Algiers, and the capital of the Baraki district is situated about 14km southeast of Algiers and 35km northeast of Blida

Municipalities
The district is further divided into 3 municipalities, which is the lowest number in the province:
Baraki
Les Eucalyptus 
Sidi Moussa

Location
Baraki is situated in the eastern South of Algiers province, it is 10 Km Far to the Capital. It's bordered in the North by El-Harrach, Bourouba and Gue de Constantine. In the South By Sidi Moussa and in the east there's L'Eucalyptus, and in the West there are: Ain-Naadja, Baba-Ali and S'haoula.

Urbanism
Baraki has a lot of cities; which are superposed through the area of the town. here are some of their names: Delbouz City, Ben Ghazi City, Merdja City, Menasria City, 2004 Logts City, 13 Hectares City, Recazin City also there is Saliba City and Sbaies City, Mihoub City, Bentalha City.

Transport
Baraki has different means of transports like: Buses, Taxi and soon the Subways. For the Buses, there is one Station which located near the metro station (still in working). this Bus Station has two different lines, one belongs to the Public Company of Transport (ETUSA) and the other line is for private Transporters. these transporters have many Destinations and it vary in prices and places:

Private
the main destinations:
 Baraki - Kouba
 Baraki - L'Eucalyptus
 Baraki - Larbaa
 Baraki - Sidi-Moussa
 Baraki - Bentalha
 Baraki - Boumati
 Baraki - 2nd May (Champ-des-Manoeuvres)

Public
 Baraki - Ben-Aknoun
 Baraki - L'Eucalyptus
 Baraki - Birtouta
 Baraki - El-Harrach
 Baraki - Bach-djerah

Education
The City contains around 13 educational institutions distributed among their own surface:
 Elementary Schools:
Ahmed Ben Attou, Belkhoudja, ES-Salam, abu ther Elgheffari, 8 May 1954, Colonel Amirouche...etc.

  Colleges:
Maaraket El-Yarmook 1, Bougherra Bachir (El-Yarmook 2), Ibn Taymiya (Sorecal), Douibi Madani, Chayeb Yahya...etc.

 High Schools:
Tarek Ibn Ziyad 1, Tarek Ibn Ziyad 2, Baha Mekaoui, Ahmed Touileb, Ahmed Hamani...etc.

Notable people

Districts of Algiers Province